The Olympus E-520 (or Olympus EVOLT E-520 in North America) is a 10 megapixel digital single-lens reflex (DSLR) camera.

Features
Announced in May 2008 to succeed the E-510, The E-520 adds face detection technology, auto focus live preview, wireless flash capability and shadow adjustment technology. It also features a slightly larger LCD screen designed to improve contrast and give a wider angle of viewing and a faster continuous shooting speed.

The E-520 body and lens mount conform to the "Four Thirds System" standard, providing compatibility with other lenses for that system.

The E-520 uses Olympus' Supersonic Wave Filter dust reduction system to shake dust from the sensor during startup and when requested by the user. This system largely eliminates the problem of dust accumulation on the surface of the image sensor.

The E-520 cannot recharge the battery via USB

External links
 
Product page
Specifications at dpreview.com

E-520
Live-preview digital cameras
Four Thirds System
Cameras introduced in 2008